The Idiot is a costume drama TV series of Vladimir Bortko produced by Telekanal Rossiya in 2003, based on Fyodor Dostoevsky's 1869 novel of the same title.

The series' script is very close to Dostoevsky's original text, and the series features well-known Russian actors. According to bonus materials included on the DVD, in order to improve authenticity, serious efforts were made to capture the spirit of the time, through proper way of speaking, and through very careful selection of costumes for the actors to wear.

The series was branded by the novel's original pre-1920s orthography title "идіотъ" (in all caps) instead of the current "идиот" as one will find it on the bookshelves in Russia (to promote the atmosphere of the tsarist time when the film's plot takes place). This branded title "ИДІОТЪ" can be seen at the beginning of each part and on the cover of the DVD release.

The series consists of 10 parts each approximately 50 minutes.

Cast
Evgeny Mironov — Prince Myshkin
 Lidiya Velezheva — Nastasya Filippovna
Vladimir Mashkov — Parfyon Rogozhin
Aleksandr Lazarev Jr. — Gavrilya Ardalionovich Ivolgin
Oleg Basilashvili — General Ivan Yepanchin
Inna Churikova —Elizaveta Prokofieevna Yepanchina, General Yepanchin's wife
Olga Budina — Aglaya Ivanovna Yepanchina, their youngest daughter
Aleksandr Domogarov — Evgeny Pavlovich (Aglaya's suitor)
Aleksey Petrenko — general Ardalion Ivolgin, Ganya's father
Vladimir Ilyin — Lebedev

Trivia 
On several occasions in the series, one can observe "today's" Russian flag, the white-blue-red Tricolour. This, however, is the director's mistake. Dostoevsky himself died in 1881, and the novel is set earlier. (It was written in 1869.) While this flag was already used in tsarist Russia, it was admitted for use on land only in 1883 (previously used on sea) and became the official flag of the empire in 1896. Thus, the black-gold-silver tsarist flag should have been used in the film.

References

External links 

Movie Trailer and Screenshots
Page on Yevgeny Mironov’s Official Website

Russia-1 original programming
Films based on The Idiot
Television shows directed by Vladimir Bortko
Russian television miniseries
Russian drama television series
2003 Russian television series debuts
2003 Russian television series endings
2000s Russian television series